Bhupendrabhai Patel had been sworn in as 17th Chief Minister of Gujarat on 13 September 2021. His cabinet includes 10 cabinet ministers and 14 ministers of state, including five ministers of state with independent charge.

Background
On 11 September 2021, Vijay Rupani resigned from the post of Chief Minister of Gujarat. Patel was unanimously elected as the BJP legislative party leader and Chief Minister-elect of Gujarat on 12 September 2021 in the party legislature meeting at Gandhinagar. He sworn in as the Chief Minister of Gujarat on 13 September 2021 by Governor Acharya Devvrat. The rest of his cabinet was sworn in on 16 September 2021. The cabinet includes 10 cabinet ministers and 14 ministers of state, including five ministers of state with independent charge.

Council of Ministers

Cabinet Ministers

Ministers in charge

Ministers of state 

|}

Source:

District Wise break up

References

Lists of current Indian state and territorial ministries
Bharatiya Janata Party state ministries
2021 in Indian politics
Gujarat ministries
Cabinets established in 2021